The Mississippi State Bulldogs football statistical leaders are individual statistical leaders of the Mississippi State Bulldogs football program in various categories, including passing, rushing, total offense, all-purpose yardage, receiving, defensive stats, and kicking. Within those areas, the lists identify single-game, single-season and career leaders. The Bulldogs represent Mississippi State University in the NCAA's Southeastern Conference.

Although Mississippi State began competing in intercollegiate football in 1895, the school's official record book considers the "modern era" to have begun in 1950. Records from before this year are often incomplete and inconsistent, and they are generally not included in these lists. For example, Harry Furman rushed for 7 touchdowns twice in the 1907 season, but complete records for the season are unavailable.

These lists are dominated by more recent players for several reasons:
 Since 1955, seasons have increased from 10 games to 11 and then 12 games in length.
 The NCAA didn't allow freshmen to play varsity football until 1972 (with the exception of the World War II years), allowing players to have four-year careers.
 Bowl games only began counting toward single-season and career statistics in 2002. The Bulldogs have played in 12 bowl games since then.
 Each of recent head coach Dan Mullen's nine seasons (2009–17) rank in the Bulldogs' 10 highest in total offensive output. When he left after the 2017 season, all but two of 30 offensive lists displayed below have a Mullen-era player in sole possession or tied for the top spot. During the Mike Leach Era (2020–22), the Bulldogs ran an air raid offense, leading to records in passing.

These lists are updated through the end of the 2022 season.

Passing

Completions

Passing yards

Passing touchdowns

Rushing

Rushing yards

Rushing touchdowns

Receiving

Receptions

Receiving yards

Receiving touchdowns

Total offense
Total offense is the sum of passing and rushing statistics. It does not include receiving or returns.

Total offense yards

Touchdowns responsible for
"Touchdowns responsible for" is the NCAA's official term for combined passing and rushing touchdowns.

All-purpose yardage
All-purpose yardage is the sum of all yards credited to a player who is in possession of the ball. It includes rushing, receiving, and all types of returns, but does not include passing.

Defense

Interceptions

Tackles

Sacks

Kicking

Field goals made

Field goal percentage

See also
 Mississippi State Bulldogs men's basketball statistical leaders
 Mississippi State Bulldogs women's basketball statistical leaders

References

Lists of college football statistical leaders by team